Alfred F. Puffer  (1840 – July 1, 1875)  was Deputy Collector of Customs at the United States Customs House in New York City. He was appointed to this office by Chester A. Arthur on October 1, 1873. He was an entry clerk.  During the American Civil War Puffer served on the staff of General Benjamin F. Butler. He was a native of Massachusetts.

Puffer died suddenly of apoplexy at his 24th Street, Manhattan, New York residence, in 1875. He left his office at the Customs House on the afternoon of June 30 and returned to his home. Feeling a warm sensation he unwisely resolved to take a bath. His wife summoned friends for assistance when he failed to respond to a knock on the bathroom door. They found him unconscious on the floor and a physician was quickly summoned. Puffer died the following morning at 9 a.m. He was survived by his wife and two children. His son Fred Puffer became a champion hurdler in the 1890s.

References

1840 births
1875 deaths
People from Massachusetts
People of Massachusetts in the American Civil War
Deaths from bleeding